The Mixed Laser was a sailing event on the Sailing at the 2004 Summer Olympics program in Agios Kosmas Olympic Sailing Centre. Eleven races were scheduled and completed with one discard. 42 sailors, on 42 boats, from 42 nation competed.

Race schedule

Course area and course configuration

Weather conditions

Final results

Daily standings

Further reading

References 

Open Laser
Laser (dinghy) competitions
Unisex sailing at the Summer Olympics